Lars Stenbäck (born 11 January 1956) is a Swedish former footballer who played as a midfielder. He made 118 Allsvenskan appearances for Djurgårdens IF and scored eight goals.

References

Living people
1956 births
Association football midfielders
Swedish footballers
Sweden under-21 international footballers
Allsvenskan players
Djurgårdens IF Fotboll players
IFK Västerås players
Hammarby Fotboll players
IFK Eskilstuna players